Fellhanera borbonica is a species of lichen in the family Pilocarpaceae. It was described as new to science in 2011. Found in Réunion, the specific epithet borbonica denotes the original name for Réunion, or Île Bourbon.

References

Pilocarpaceae
Lichen species
Lichens described in 2011
Lichens of Réunion
Taxa named by Emmanuël Sérusiaux